Allyl phenyl ether is an organic compound with the formula C6H5OCH2CH=CH2. It is a colorless solid.

Preparation
Allyl phenyl ether is prepared by the reaction of sodium phenoxide with allyl bromide:
C6H5ONa  +  BrCH2CH=CH2  →  C6H5OCH2CH=CH2  +  NaBr
The yield is almost quantitative when the reaction is conducted in homogeneous solution using dimethoxyethane.  When the reaction is conducted as a slurry in diethyl ether, the predominant product is, after acidic work-up, 2-allylphenol.

Reactions
Allyl phenyl ether converts to 2-allylphenol in the presence of acid catalysts. This conversion is an example of the claisen rearrangement.

References

Phenol ethers
Phenyl compounds
Allyl compounds